The 2022 French Open's day-by-day summaries and order of play for main draw matches on the three main tennis courts, starting from May 22 until June 5. 

All dates are in CEST.

Day 1 (22 May) 
Seeds out:
 Men's Singles:  Alejandro Davidovich Fokina [25],  Jenson Brooksby [31]
 Women's Singles:  Ons Jabeur [6],  Garbiñe Muguruza [10]
Schedule of play

Day 2 (23 May) 
Rain disrupted play for two hours at 1pm in the afternoon. The main roof was closed for the remainder of the session.

Seeds out:
 Men's Singles:  Reilly Opelka [17]
 Women's Singles:  Barbora Krejčíková [2],  Anett Kontaveit [5],  Liudmila Samsonova [25]
Schedule of play

Day 3 (24 May) 
Seeds out:
 Men's Singles:  Denis Shapovalov [14],  Pablo Carreño Busta [16],  Alex de Minaur [19],  Tommy Paul [30]
 Men's Doubles:  Juan Sebastián Cabal /  Robert Farah [5],  John Peers /  Filip Polášek [8],  Santiago González /  Andrés Molteni [13]
Schedule of play

Day 4 (25 May) 
Seeds out:
 Men's Singles:  Taylor Fritz [13]
 Women's Singles:  Maria Sakkari [4],  Emma Raducanu [12],  Sorana Cirstea, [26]  Petra Kvitová [32]
 Men's Doubles:  Pierre-Hugues Herbert /  Nicolas Mahut [3],  Kevin Krawietz /  Andreas Mies [9],  Matthew Ebden /  Max Purcell [14]
 Women's Doubles:  Alexa Guarachi /  Andreja Klepač [6],  Nicole Melichar-Martinez /  Ellen Perez [16]
Schedule of play

Day 5 (26 May) 
Seeds out:
 Men's Singles:  Nikoloz Basilashvili [22],  Frances Tiafoe [24],  Dan Evans [29]
 Women's Singles:  Karolína Plíšková [8],  Danielle Collins [9],  Jeļena Ostapenko [13],  Simona Halep [19],  Ekaterina Alexandrova [30]
 Men's Doubles:  Máximo González /  Marcelo Melo [15]
 Women's Doubles:  Shuko Aoyama /  Chan Hao-ching [11],  Magda Linette /  Bernarda Pera [15]
 Mixed Doubles:  Zhang Shuai /  Nicolas Mahut [1],  Anna Danilina /  Andrey Golubev [6],  Bernarda Pera /  Mate Pavić [7],  Giuliana Olmos /  Marcelo Arévalo [8]
Schedule of play

Day 6 (27 May) 
Seeds out:
 Men's Singles:  Cameron Norrie [10],  Grigor Dimitrov [18],  John Isner [23],  Botic van de Zandschulp [26],  Sebastian Korda [27]
 Women's Singles:  Belinda Bencic [14],  Victoria Azarenka [15],  Angelique Kerber [21]  
 Men's Doubles:  Jamie Murray /  Bruno Soares [10]
 Women's Doubles:  Desirae Krawczyk /  Demi Schuurs [5],  Caroline Dolehide /  Storm Sanders [7],  Anna Danilina /  Beatriz Haddad Maia [12]
Schedule of play

Day 7 (28 May) 
Seeds out:
 Men's Singles:  Miomir Kecmanović [28],  Lorenzo Sonego [32]
 Women's Singles:  Paula Badosa [3],  Aryna Sabalenka [7],  Elena Rybakina [16],  Tamara Zidanšek [24]
 Men's Doubles:  Nikola Mektić /  Mate Pavić [2]
Schedule of play

Day 8 (29 May) 
Seeds out:
 Men's Singles:  Félix Auger-Aliassime [9],  Diego Schwartzman [15],  Karen Khachanov [21]
 Women's Singles:  Jil Teichmann [23],  Amanda Anisimova [27],  Elise Mertens [31]
 Men's Doubles:  Tim Pütz /  Michael Venus [7]
 Women's Doubles:  Gabriela Dabrowski /  Giuliana Olmos [3],  Caty McNally /  Zhang Shuai [4],  Asia Muhammad /  Ena Shibahara [9]
 Mixed Doubles:  Andreja Klepač /  Rohan Bopanna [5]
Schedule of play

Day 9 (30 May) 
Seeds out:
 Men's Singles:  Daniil Medvedev [2],  Stefanos Tsitsipas [4],  Jannik Sinner [11],  Hubert Hurkacz [12]
 Women's Singles:  Madison Keys [22],  Camila Giorgi [28]
 Women's Doubles:  Veronika Kudermetova /  Elise Mertens [2]
 Mixed Doubles:  Desirae Krawczyk /  Neal Skupski [4]
Schedule of play

Day 10 (31 May) 
Seeds out:
 Men's Singles:  Novak Djokovic [1],  Carlos Alcaraz [6]
 Women's Singles:  Leylah Fernandez [17]
 Men's Doubles:  Rajeev Ram /  Joe Salisbury [1],  Wesley Koolhof /  Neal Skupski [6]
 Women's Doubles:  Lucie Hradecká /  Sania Mirza [10]
Schedule of play

Day 11 (1 June) 
Seeds out:
 Men's Singles:  Andrey Rublev [7]
 Women's Singles:  Jessica Pegula [11],  Veronika Kudermetova [29]
 Women's Doubles:  Xu Yifan /  Yang Zhaoxuan [13]
 Mixed Doubles:  Gabriela Dabrowski /  John Peers [3]
Schedule of play

Day 12 (2 June) 
Seeds out:
 Women's Singles:  Daria Kasatkina [20]
 Men's Doubles:  Marcel Granollers /  Horacio Zeballos [4],  Rohan Bopanna /  Matwé Middelkoop [16]
Schedule of play

Day 13 (3 June) 
Seeds out:
 Men's Singles:  Alexander Zverev [3],  Marin Čilić [20]
 Women's Doubles:  Lyudmyla Kichenok /  Jeļena Ostapenko [14]
Schedule of play

Day 14 (4 June) 
Seeds out:
 Women's Singles:  Coco Gauff [18]
Schedule of play

Day 15 (5 June) 
Seeds out:
 Men's Singles:  Casper Ruud [8]
 Women's Doubles:  Coco Gauff /  Jessica Pegula [8]
Schedule of play

References

Day-by-day summaries
French Open by year – Day-by-day summaries